Anathallis ferdinandiana is a species of orchid.

References 

ferdinandiana